These are the statistics for UEFA Euro 2000, held in Belgium and Netherlands.

Goalscorers

Assists

Clean sheets

Awards
UEFA Team of the Tournament

Golden Boot
 Savo Milošević (5 goals)
 Patrick Kluivert (5 goals)

UEFA Player of the Tournament
 Zinedine Zidane

Man of the Match

Scoring
Overview

Average goals per match: 2.74
Top scorer(s): 5 -  Patrick Kluivert,  Savo Milošević
Most goals scored by a team: 13 – , 
Fewest goals scored by a team: 0 – 
Most goals conceded by a team: 13 – 
Fewest goals conceded by a team: 1 – 
First goal of the tournament:  Bart Goor vs. 
Last goal of the tournament:  David Trezeguet vs. 
Fastest goal in a match: 3 minutes –  Paul Scholes vs. 
Latest goal in a match without extra time: 90+6 minutes –  Alfonso vs. 
Latest goal in a match with extra time: 117 minutes –  Zinedine Zidane vs.

Wins and losses
Most wins: 5 - France, Italy
Fewest wins: 0 - Denmark, Germany, Slovenia, Sweden
Most losses: 3 - Denmark
Fewest losses: - 0 - Netherlands

Discipline
Sanctions against foul play at UEFA Euro 2000 are in the first instance the responsibility of the referee, but when he deems it necessary to give a caution, or dismiss a player, UEFA keeps a record and may enforce a suspension. Referee decisions are generally seen as final. However, UEFA's disciplinary committee may additionally penalise players for offences unpunished by the referee.

Overview

Red cards
A player receiving a red card is automatically suspended for the next match. A longer suspension is possible if the UEFA disciplinary committee judges the offence as warranting it. In keeping with the FIFA Disciplinary Code (FDC) and UEFA Disciplinary Regulations (UDR), UEFA does not allow for appeals of red cards except in the case of mistaken identity. The FDC further stipulates that if a player is sent off during his team's final Euro 2008 match, the suspension carries over to his team's next competitive international(s). For Euro 2000 these were the qualification matches for the 2002 FIFA World Cup.

Any player who was suspended due to a red card that was earned in Euro 2000 qualifying was required to serve the balance of any suspension unserved by the end of qualifying either in the Euro 2000 finals (for any player on a team that qualified, whether he had been selected to the final squad or not) or in World Cup qualifying (for players on teams that did not qualify).

Yellow cards
Any player receiving a single yellow card during two of the three group stage matches plus the quarter-final match was suspended for the next match. A single yellow card does not carry over to the semi-finals. This means that no player will be suspended for final unless he gets sent off in semi-final or he is serving a longer suspension for an earlier incident. Suspensions due to yellow cards will not carry over to the World Cup qualifiers. Yellow cards and any related suspensions earned in the Euro 2004 qualifiers are neither counted nor enforced in the final tournament.

In the event a player is sent off for two bookable offences, only the red card is counted for disciplinary purposes. However, in the event a player receives a direct red card after being booked in the same match, then both cards are counted. If the player was already facing a suspension for two tournament bookings when he was sent off, this would result in separate suspensions that would be served consecutively. The one match ban for the yellow cards would be served first unless the player's team is eliminated in the match in which he was sent off.  If the player's team is eliminated in the match in which he was serving his ban for the yellow cards, then the ban for the sending off would be carried over to the World Cup qualifiers.

Additional punishment
For serious transgressions, a longer suspension may be handed down at the discretion of the UEFA disciplinary committee. The disciplinary committee is also charged with reviewing any incidents that were missed by the officials and can award administrative red cards and suspensions accordingly. However, just as appeals of red cards are not considered, the disciplinary committee is also not allowed to review transgressions that were already punished by the referee with something less than a red card. For example, if a player is booked but not sent off for a dangerous tackle, the disciplinary committee cannot subsequently deem the challenge to be violent conduct and then upgrade the card to a red. However, if the same player then spits at the opponent but is still not sent off, then the referee's report would be unlikely to mention this automatic red card offence. Video evidence of the spitting incident could then be independently reviewed.

Unlike the rules in many domestic competitions, there is no particular category of red card offence that automatically results in a multi-game suspension. In general however, extended bans are only assessed for red cards given for serious foul play, violent conduct, spitting or perhaps foul and abusive language. Also, unlike many sets of domestic rules second and subsequent red cards also do not automatically incur an extended ban, although a player's past disciplinary record (including prior competition) might be considered by the disciplinary committee when punishing him. As a rule, only automatic red card offenses are considered for longer bans. A player who gets sent off for picking up two yellow cards in the same match will not have his automatic one-match ban extended by UEFA on account of what he did to get the second booking, because the referee has deemed him as not to have committed an automatic red card offense.

If UEFA suspends a player after his team's elimination from the tournament, or for more games than the team ends up playing without him prior to the final or their elimination (whichever comes first), then the remaining suspension must be served during World Cup qualifying. For a particularly grave offence UEFA has the power to impose a lengthy ban against the offender.

Disciplinary statistics
Total number of yellow cards  : 122
Average yellow cards per match: 3.93
Total number of red cards  : 10
Average red cards per match: 0.32
First yellow card: Gheorghe Hagi and Adrian Ilie against Germany
First red card: Patrik Andersson against Belgium
Most yellow cards: 13 – Netherlands Portugal
Fewest yellow cards: 2 – Sweden
Most yellow cards in a match: 9 - Italy vs. Netherlands

By individual

Red cards
Ten red cards were shown over the course of the tournament's 31 matches, an average of 0.32 red cards per match.

1 red card
  Filip De Wilde
  Radoslav Látal
  Gianluca Zambrotta
  Nuno Gomes
  Gheorghe Hagi
  Patrik Andersson
  Alpay Özalan
  Slaviša Jokanović
  Mateja Kežman
  Siniša Mihajlović

Yellow cards
122 yellow cards were shown over the course of the tournament's 31 matches, an average of 3.94 yellow cards per match

3 yellow cards
 Giovanni van Bronckhorst
 Gheorghe Hagi

2 yellow cards
  Karel Poborský
  Marcel Desailly
  Lillian Thuram
  Patrick Vieira
  Luigi Di Biagio
  Gianluca Zambrotta
  Edgar Davids
  Luís Figo
  João Pinto
  Gheorghe Hagi
  Adrian Ilie
  Dan Petrescu
  Darko Milanič
  Miran Pavlin
  Slaviša Jokanović
  Siniša Mihajlović

1 yellow card
  Mbo Mpenza
  Luc Nilis
  Nico Van Kerckhoven
  Yves Vanderhaeghe
  Gert Verheyen
  Marc Wilmots
  Milan Fukal
  Petr Gabriel
  Marek Jankulovski
  Pavel Nedvěd
  Jiří Němec
  Karel Rada
  Tomáš Řepka
  Jesper Grønkjær
  Miklos Molnar
  Allan Nielsen
  Michael Schjønberg
  Stig Tøfting
  David Beckham
  Paul Ince
  Alan Shearer
  Didier Deschamps
  Christophe Dugarry
  Markus Babbel
  Michael Ballack
  Carsten Jancker
  Jens Jeremies
  Paulo Rink
  Demetrio Albertini
  Fabio Cannavaro
  Antonio Conte
  Mark Iuliano

1 yellow card (cont.)
  Paolo Maldini
  Francesco Toldo
  Francesco Totti
  Paul Bosvelt
  Phillip Cocu
  Frank de Boer
  Bert Konterman
  Michael Reiziger
  Jaap Stam
  Edwin van der Sar
  Boudewijn Zenden
  Vítor Baía
  Beto
  Costinha
  Jorge Costa
  Rui Costa
  Fernando Couto
  Paulo Sousa
  Dimas Teixeira
  Luís Vidigal
  Cristian Chivu
  Cosmin Contra
  Iulian Filipescu
  Amir Karič
  Džoni Novak
  Alfonso
  Agustín Aranzábal
  Joseba Etxeberría
  Josep Guardiola
  Iván Helguera
  Paco
  Sergi
  Patrik Andersson
  Johan Mjällby
  Okan Buruk
  Suat Kaya
  Tayfun Korkut
  Ogün Temizkanoğlu
  Hakan Ünsal
  Ljubinko Drulović
  Vladimir Jugović
  Slobodan Komljenović
  Albert Nađ
  Niša Saveljić
  Jovan Stanković
  Dragan Stojković

By referee

By team

Clean sheets
Most clean sheets (team): 3 - Italy, Netherlands, Portugal
Fewest clean sheets (team): 0 – Belgium, Denmark, Germany, Romania, Spain

Overall statistics
In the following tables:
 Pld = total games played
 W = total games won
 D = total games drawn (tied)
 L = total games lost
 Pts = total points accumulated (teams receive three points for a win, one point for a draw and no points for a loss)
 APts = average points per game
 GF = total goals scored (goals for)
 AGF = average goals scored per game
 GA = total goals conceded (goals against)
 AGA = average goals conceded per game
 GD = goal difference (GF−GA)
 CS = clean sheets
 ACS = average clean sheets
 YC = yellow cards
 AYC = average yellow cards
 RC = red cards
 ARC = average red cards

BOLD indicates that this nation has the highest 
Italics indicates the host nation

Notes

References 

Statistics
2000